Rozella May Schlotfeldt (June 29, 1914 – July 23, 2005) was an American nurse, educator, and researcher. Originally from DeWitt, Iowa, Schlotfeldt received her BS in nursing from the University of Iowa in 1935. She continued her studies at the University of Chicago in 1947 before becoming the dean of the Frances Payne Bolton School of Nursing at Case Western Reserve University in 1960.

Early life 
Rozella M. Schlotfeldt was born in 1914 in DeWitt, Iowa. Her father, John, was a businessman, and her mother, Clara, was a nurse. Her father died in 1918 when she was just four years old, so her mother went back to work to support Rozella and her four older sisters.

Education 
Schlotfeldt graduated from her high school as the valedictorian in 1931. She went on to study nursing at the University of Iowa where she graduated magna cum laude with a BS in Nursing in 1935. During an employment period with University of Iowa Hospitals, Schlotfeldt completed a postgraduate program at Cornell University in conjunction with New York Hospital. In 1947, she received her MS in Nursing Education and Administration from the University of Chicago. By 1956, Schlotfeldt finished her Ph.D in Nursing Education at the University of Chicago.

Throughout her schooling, Schlotfeldt was a member of Sigma Theta Tau, an honors nursing fraternity. Schlotfeldt also holds an honorary doctorate from Georgetown University.

Career 
Immediately following her graduation from the University of Iowa, Schlotfeldt was hired by University of Iowa Hospitals as a maternity staff nurse. In 1936, she took the position as staff and head nurse of the Veterans' Hospital in Des Moines, Iowa. Following that position, Schlotfeldt, became an instructor and supervisor of maternity nursing at the University of Iowa Hospitals.

Leaving the hospital setting, Schlotfeldt went and worked in the Army Nurse Corps during World War II where she served in England, France, and Austria. Following the war, she became an assistant professor at the University of Colorado.

However, she did not get much teaching time, so she moved on to Wayne State University. There, she was an assistant professor until 1955, where she left to work on her Ph.D. After she finished her Ph.D, Schlotfeldt returned to Wayne State University as an associate dean of research.

A few years later, in 1960, Schlotfeldt moved on to become the dean of the Frances Payne Bolton School of Nursing at Case Western Reserve University. While serving as dean, Schlotfeldt created the collaboration model of nursing where she combined clinical learning with lectures to ensure the best education of incoming nurses. This collaboration model is still in use today between the Frances Payne Bolton School and University Hospitals of Cleveland. She remained there until she retired as dean in 1972, but continued her career as a professor for nursing students until 1982.

Shortly after she was appointed to dean of the Frances Payne Bolton School, Schlotfeldt joined the task force to pass the 1964 Nurse Training Act. While at Case Western Reserve University, Schlotfeldt also served as a special consultant to the Surgeon General's Advisory Group on Nursing from 1961 to 1963. From 1967 to 1974, Schlotfeldt served on the board for the Walter Reed Army Institute for Nursing Research. Shortly before her retirement, she was the president of the Ohio Board of Nursing Education and Nurse Registration.

In 1971, Schlotfeldt was elected to the Institute of Medicine for the National Academy of Sciences.

Throughout the years, Schlotfeldt was a visiting professor at various universities including, Indiana University, University of Texas-Austin, University of Alabama-Birmingham, University of San Diego, Rutgers University, and University of Pennsylvania.

Furthermore, Schlotfeldt served as president on the American Nurses Association Study Committee as well as the American Academy of Nursing. Schlotfeldt also co-founded the Midwest Nursing Research Society (known today as the Midwest Alliance in Nursing) and was a member on the Council of Nurses. Schlotfeldt also served as the first nurse on the Council and Executive Committee of the Institute of Medicine.

Table of Committee Positions 

Positions found in CWRU Archives

Awards, honors and memberships 

Awards found in the CWRU Archives

Publications 
Schlotfeldt has published over 100 works regarding her research. Her first being her dissertation titled, "The Educational Leadership Role of Nursing School Executives and Faculty Satisfaction." in 1956. 

All of her publications can be found in the archives at the University of Pennsylvania.

References

1914 births
2005 deaths
American women nurses
People from DeWitt, Iowa
University of Iowa alumni
University of Chicago alumni
Case Western Reserve University faculty
Nursing school deans
Wayne State University faculty
University of Colorado faculty
United States Army Nurse Corps officers
20th-century American women
21st-century American women
American women academics
Military personnel from Iowa
Members of the National Academy of Medicine